Gerardo Flores may refer to:

 Gerardo Humberto Flores Reyes (1925–2022), Guatemalan Roman Catholic prelate
 Gerardo Flores (footballer), Mexican footballer
 Gerardo Flores (murderer) (born 1986), American murderer